Xanthophaeina is a monotypic moth genus in the family Erebidae erected by George Hampson. Its only species, Xanthophaeina levis, was first described by Herbert Druce in 1899. It is found in Colombia and Brazil.

References

Phaegopterina
Monotypic moth genera
Moths of South America